Universal Power Drives was a British truck manufacturer which branded its trucks with the Unipower marque.

History
Universal Power Drives was founded in 1934 with a factory in Perivale and its head office in Aldwych, London.  During the 1930s, 40s and 50s it specialised in producing 4x4 forestry logging trucks.  In 1972 it launched the 4x4 Unipower Invader suited to fire-fighting and construction use.

Todd Motors in New Zealand produced the TS3 Commer Truck, in the early 1970s, with a Unipower tandem drive assembly as a factory option.

In January 1966 they exhibited a sports car, the Unipower GT at the Racing Car Show.  Another car they produced was the Quasar-Unipower which was built in 1967 and 1968.

In 1977 the company was acquired by Caterpillar Inc and production was moved to Thames Ditton, Surrey.

In 1988 the company started a new enterprise in Watford to provide continuity of support for Scammell trucks following the closure of the Leyland DAF (formerly British Leyland) owned Scammell plant that year.

In the 1980s it launched the C-series heavy-haulage tractor and a range of military trucks.

Alvis plc acquired the company in 1994 and named their new subsidiary Alvis Unipower Limited, the trucks began to be branded as Alvis-Unipower.

Following their elimination from the bidding process for the UK Ministry of Defence's Heavy Equipment Transporter (HET) project, Alvis announced their intention to seek a new owner for Alvis Unipower.

References

Bibliography 

Defunct truck manufacturers of the United Kingdom
Motor vehicle manufacturers based in London
Vehicle manufacturing companies established in 1934
Former defence companies of the United Kingdom
1934 establishments in the United Kingdom